Arne & Carlos are a duo of textile designers specialising in knitted goods, and consisting of Arne Nerjordet and Carlos Zachrison. Their knitwear designs draw both on traditional Scandinavian and on contemporary influences. Julekuler, their book of patterns for knitting woolen Christmas balls, sold more than 50,000 copies in Norway, and has been translated into several languages including English, where it is called 55 Christmas Balls to Knit. Arne & Carlos have written or contributed to eight books that focus on knitting. They have been recognised by the Boston Globe as a resource for beginner knitters. The Guardian credits the pair with the rising popularity of knitted Christmas baubles prior to and around 2015.

Personal life 
Nerjordet, Norwegian by birth, is the more experienced knitter. He is influenced by several generations of knitting in his family, having learned from his mother, grandmother, and great-grandmother. Zachrison is Swedish and South American. Though he is the less experienced knitter of the pair, he is reported to have come from an artistic family in Sweden.

Nerjordet has been quoted in an interview with ABC News (AU) saying, "When I grew up, it was not normal for a little boy to be knitting, so I was different. But I didn't care; I just kept knitting."

Controversy 
The pair gained notoriety with an Instagram post of a knitted facsimile of Kim Kardashian's nude photo for Paper magazine. Zachrison credited Nejordet with knitting Kardashian's likeness in three days. Despite having written books publishing other knitting patterns, the pair declined to release a pattern for this item.

Works

References

Further reading 
 
 

Manufacturing companies of Sweden
Manufacturing companies of Norway
Clothing manufacturers
People in knitting